CNG is compressed natural gas, methane stored at high pressure.

CNG may also refer to:
 Certified Naturally Grown, a non-profit farm assurance certification program
 Chinese Garden MRT station (MRT station abbreviation CNG), a Mass Rapid Transit station in Jurong East, Singapore
 Connecticut Natural Gas, a natural gas distribution company
 Cryptography API: Next Generation, an update of Microsoft CryptoAPI introduced in Windows Vista
 Cyclic nucleotide–gated ion channel, ion channels that function in response to the binding of cyclic nucleotides
 National Council of Government (Haiti), provisional government of Haiti from 1986 to 1988, natively Conseil National de Gouvernement

See also
 Auto rickshaw, sometimes referred to in Bangladesh as CNGs